William Baldwin O'Neill is an American politician and a Democratic member of the New Mexico Senate representing District 13 since January 15, 2013. O'Neill served consecutively in the New Mexico Legislature from January 2009 until December 2012 in the New Mexico House of Representatives District 15 seat.

Education
O'Neill attended Cornell University, where he was a member of the Quill and Dagger society.

Elections
2012 When Senate District 13 Democratic Senator Dede Feldman retired and left the seat open, O'Neill ran in the three-way June 5, 2012 Democratic Primary, winning with 2,620 votes (52.9%) and was unopposed for the November 6, 2012 General election, winning with 15,516 votes.
2002 When House District 15 incumbent Democratic Representative John Sanchez ran for Governor of New Mexico and left the seat open, O'Neill ran in the three-way 2002 Democratic Primary but lost to Steven Archibeque, who lost the November 5, 2002 General election to Republican nominee Teresa Zanetti.
2004 To challenge Representative Zanetti, O'Neill was unopposed for the June 1, 2004 Democratic Primary, winning with 1,472 votes but lost the November 2, 2004 General election to Representative Zanetti.
2008 O'Neill and Representative Zanetti were both unopposed for their June 8, 2008 primaries, setting up a rematch; O'Neill won the November 4, 2008 General election with 7,532 votes (52.1%) against Representative Zanetti.
2010 O'Neill was unopposed for the June 1, 2010 Democratic Primary, winning with 1,522 votes and the November 2, 2010 General election, winning with 5,545 votes (50.8%) against Republican nominee Justin Horwitz.

References

External links
Official page at the New Mexico Legislature
Campaign site

Bill O'Neill at Ballotpedia
William Bill B. O'Neill at the National Institute on Money in State Politics

Place of birth missing (living people)
Year of birth missing (living people)
Living people
Cornell University alumni
Democratic Party members of the New Mexico House of Representatives
Democratic Party New Mexico state senators
Politicians from Albuquerque, New Mexico
21st-century American politicians